The 16th British Independent Film Awards, held  on 8 December 2013 in London, were hosted by James Nesbitt. The awards honoured the best British independent films of 2013.

Awards

Best Director
 Sean Ellis – Metro Manila
 Jon S Baird – Filth
 Clio Barnard – The Selfish Giant
Jonathan Glazer – Under the Skin
David Mackenzie – Starred Up

The Douglas Hickox Award
Given to a British director on their debut feature.
 Paul Wright – For Those in Peril
 Charlie Cattrall – Titus
 Tina Gharavi – I Am Nasrine
 Jeremy Lovering – In Fear
 Omid Nooshin – Last Passenger

Best Screenplay
 Steven Knight – Locke
 Jonathan Asser – Starred Up
 Clio Barnard – The Selfish Giant
 Hanif Kureishi – Le Week-End
 Jeff Pope, Steve Coogan – Philomena

Best Actress
 Lindsay Duncan – Le Week-End
 Judi Dench – Philomena
 Scarlett Johansson – Under the Skin
 Felicity Jones – The Invisible Woman
 Saoirse Ronan – How I Live Now

Best Supporting Actress
 Imogen Poots – The Look Of Love
 Siobhan Finneran – The Selfish Giant
 Shirley Henderson – Filth
 Kristin Scott Thomas – The Invisible Woman
 Mia Wasikowska – The Double

Best Actor
 James McAvoy – Filth  
 Jim Broadbent – Le Week-end
 Steve Coogan – Philomena
 Tom Hardy – Locke
 Jack O'Connell – Starred Up

Best Supporting Actor
 Ben Mendelsohn – Starred Up
 John Arcilla – Metro Manila
 Rupert Friend – Starred Up
 Jeff Goldblum – Le Week-end
 Eddie Marsan – Filth

Most Promising Newcomer
 Chloe Pirrie – Shell
 Harley Bird – How I Live Now
 Conner Chapman / Shaun Thomas – The Selfish Giant
 Caity Lotz – The Machine
 Jake Macapagal – Metro Manila

Best Technical Achievement
 Amy Hubbard – The Selfish Giant (Casting)
 Shaheen Baig – Starred Up (Casting)
 Johnnie Burn – Under the Skin (Sound Design)
 Mica Levi – Under the Skin (Music)
 Justine Wright – Locke (Editing)

Best Documentary
 Pussy Riot: A Punk Prayer
 The Great Hip Hop Hoax
 The Moo Man
 The Spirit of '45
 The Stone Roses: Made of Stone

Best Achievement in Production
 Metro Manila
 A Field in England
 Filth
 The Selfish Giant
 Starred Up

Best Short Film
 Z1
 L'Assenza
 Dr Easy
 Dylan's Room
 Jonah

The Raindance Award
 The Machine
 Everyone's Going to Die
 The Patrol
 Sleeping Dogs
 Titus

Best Foreign Independent Film
Blue is the Warmest Colour
The Great Beauty
Blue Jasmine
Wadjda
Frances Ha

Best British Independent Film
 Metro Manila
 Philomena
 The Selfish Giant
 Starred Up
 Le Week-End

The Richard Harris Award
Julie Walters

The Variety Award
Paul Greengrass

The Special Jury Prize
Sixteen Films & Friends (AKA Team Loach)

References

External links
  Press release – MBIFA 2013 Winners final
 Nominations 2013

British Independent Film Awards
2013 film awards
2013 in British cinema
2013 in London
December 2013 events in the United Kingdom